Juan Rivera Saavedra is an American singer and actor of Mexican heritage. He is part of one of the most prominent families, leading in regional Mexican music in the United States. His family includes singers, Jenni Rivera, Lupillo Rivera, Chiquis Rivera, and businesswoman Rosie Rivera. His songs "El Ser Equivocado" and "La Lampara" ranked on the Billboard Latin charts.

Early life and early career
Juan Rivera was born to Mexican parents, Pedro Rivera and Rosa Saavedra in the United States. He began his singing career at the age of 16 releasing his first record, El Atizador in 1996.
He also became a father at an early age. He is the younger brother of Regional Mexican singer Jenni Rivera.

Film

Television

References

External links
Juan Rivera website

Living people
American banda musicians
Place of birth missing (living people)
American musicians of Mexican descent
Hispanic and Latino American musicians
Musicians from Long Beach, California
1978 births